Chess is a board game between two players. It is sometimes called international chess or Western chess to distinguish it from related games, such as xiangqi (Chinese chess) and shogi (Japanese chess). The recorded history of chess goes back at least to the emergence of a similar game, chaturanga, in seventh-century India. The rules of chess as we know them today emerged in Europe at the end of the 15th century, with standardization and universal acceptance by the end of the 19th century.
Today, chess is one of the world's most popular games, played by millions of people worldwide.

Chess is an abstract strategy game and involves no hidden information. It is played on a chessboard with 64 squares arranged in an eight-by-eight grid. At the start, each player controls sixteen pieces: one king, one queen, two rooks, two bishops, two knights, and eight pawns. The player controlling the white pieces moves first, followed by the player controlling the black pieces. The object of the game is to checkmate the opponent's king, whereby the king is under immediate attack (in "check") and there is no way for it to escape. There are also several ways a game can end in a draw.

Organized chess arose in the 19th century. Chess competition today is governed internationally by FIDE (the International Chess Federation). The first universally recognized World Chess Champion, Wilhelm Steinitz, claimed his title in 1886; Magnus Carlsen is the current World Champion. A huge body of chess theory has developed since the game's inception. Aspects of art are found in chess composition, and chess in its turn influenced Western culture and art, and has connections with other fields such as mathematics, computer science, and psychology.

One of the goals of early computer scientists was to create a chess-playing machine. In 1997, Deep Blue became the first computer to beat the reigning World Champion in a match when it defeated Garry Kasparov. Today's chess engines are significantly stronger than the best human players and have deeply influenced the development of chess theory.

Rules

The rules of chess are published by FIDE (International Chess Federation, Fédération Internationale des Échecs), chess's international governing body, in its Handbook. Rules published by national governing bodies, or by unaffiliated chess organizations, commercial publishers, etc., may differ in some details. FIDE's rules were most recently revised in 2023.

Setup

Chess pieces are divided into two different colored sets. While the sets might not be literally white and black (e.g. the light set may be a yellowish or off-white color, the dark set may be brown or red), they are always referred to as "white" and "black". Each set consists of sixteen pieces: one king, one queen, two rooks, two bishops, two knights, and eight pawns. Chess sets come in a wide variety of styles; for competition, the Staunton pattern is preferred.

The game is played on a square board of eight rows (called ) and eight columns (called ).

The pieces are set out as shown in the diagram and photo. Thus, on White's first rank, from left to right, the pieces are placed in the following order: rook, knight, bishop, queen, king, bishop, knight, rook. On the second rank is placed a row of eight pawns. Black's position mirrors White's, with an equivalent piece on the same file. The board is placed with a light square at the right-hand corner nearest to each player. The correct positions of the king and queen may be remembered by the phrase "queen on her own color" – i.e. the white queen begins on a light square, and the black queen on a dark square.

In competitive games, the piece colors are allocated to players by the organizers; in informal games, the colors are usually decided randomly, for example by a coin toss, or by one player concealing a white pawn in one hand and a black pawn in the other, and having the opponent choose.

Movement
White moves first, after which players alternate turns, moving one piece per turn, except for castling, when two pieces are moved. A piece is moved to either an unoccupied square or one occupied by an opponent's piece, which is captured and removed from play. With the sole exception of en passant, all pieces capture by moving to the square that the opponent's piece occupies. Moving is compulsory; a player may not skip a turn, even when having to move is detrimental.

Each piece has its own way of moving. In the diagrams, the crosses mark the squares to which the piece can move if there are no intervening piece(s) of either color (except the knight, which leaps over any intervening pieces). All pieces except the pawn can capture an enemy piece if it is on a square to which they would be able to move if the square were unoccupied. 

 The king moves one square in any direction. There is also a special move called  that involves moving the king and a rook. The king is the most valuable piece—attacks on the king must be immediately countered, and if this is impossible, the game is immediately lost (see Check and checkmate below).
 A rook can move any number of squares along a rank or file, but cannot leap over other pieces. Along with the king, a rook is involved during the king's castling move.
 A bishop can move any number of squares diagonally, but cannot leap over other pieces.
 A queen combines the power of a rook and bishop and can move any number of squares along a rank, file, or diagonal, but cannot leap over other pieces.
 A knight moves to any of the closest squares that are not on the same rank, file, or diagonal. (Thus the move forms an "L"-shape: two squares vertically and one square horizontally, or two squares horizontally and one square vertically.) The knight is the only piece that can leap over other pieces.
 A pawn can move forward to the unoccupied square immediately in front of it on the same file, or on its first move it can advance two squares along the same file, provided both squares are unoccupied (black dots in the diagram). A pawn can capture an opponent's piece on a square diagonally in front of it by moving to that square (black crosses). It can capture a piece while advancing along the same file. A pawn has two special moves: the en passant capture and promotion.

Check and checkmate
When a king is under immediate attack, it is said to be . A move in response to a check is legal only if it results in a position where the king is no longer in check. This can involve capturing the checking piece; interposing a piece between the checking piece and the king (which is possible only if the attacking piece is a queen, rook, or bishop and there is a square between it and the king); or moving the king to a square where it is not under attack. Castling is not a permissible response to a check.

The object of the game is to checkmate the opponent; this occurs when the opponent's king is in check, and there is no legal way to get it out of check. It is never legal for a player to make a move that puts or leaves the player's own king in check. In casual games, it is common to announce "check" when putting the opponent's king in check, but this is not required by the rules of chess and is not usually done in tournaments.

Castling

Castling consists of moving the king two squares toward a rook of the same color on the same rank, and then placing the rook on the square that the king crossed.

Castling is permissible if the following conditions are met:
 Neither the king nor the rook has previously moved during the game.
 There are no pieces between the king and the rook.
 The king is not in check and does not pass through or land on any square attacked by an enemy piece.

Castling is still permitted if the rook is under attack, or if the rook crosses an attacked square. 

For castling notation, see § Notation.

En passant

When a pawn makes a two-step advance from its starting position and there is an opponent's pawn on a square next to the destination square on an adjacent file, then the opponent's pawn can capture it en passant ("in passing"), moving to the square the pawn passed over. This can be done only on the turn immediately following the enemy pawn's two-square advance; otherwise, the right to do so is forfeited. For example, in the animated diagram, the black pawn advances two squares from g7 to g5, and the white pawn on f5 can take it en passant on g6 (but only immediately after the black pawn's advance).

Promotion

Usually, the pawn is chosen to be promoted to a queen, but in some cases, another piece is chosen; this is called underpromotion. In the animated diagram, the pawn on c7 can be advanced to the eighth rank and be promoted. There is no restriction on the piece promoted to, so it is possible to have more pieces of the same type than at the start of the game (e.g., two or more queens). If the required piece is not available (e.g. a second queen) an inverted rook is sometimes used as a substitute, but this is not recognized in FIDE-sanctioned games.

End of the game

Win
A game can be won in the following ways:

  The king is in check and the player has no legal move. (See check and checkmate above.)
  A player may resign, conceding the game to the opponent. However, if the opponent has no way of checkmating the resigned player, this is a draw under FIDE Laws. Most tournament players consider it good etiquette to resign in a hopeless position. 
  In games with a time control, a player wins if the opponent runs out of time, even if the opponent has a superior position, as long as the player has a theoretical possibility to checkmate the opponent were the game to continue.
  A player who cheats, violates the rules, or violates the rules of conduct specified for the particular tournament can be forfeited. Occasionally, both players are forfeited.

Draw
There are several ways a game can end in a draw:
  If the player to move has no legal move, but is not in check, the position is a stalemate, and the game is drawn.
  If neither player is able to checkmate the other by any legal sequence of moves, the game is drawn. For example, if only the kings are on the board, all other pieces having been captured, checkmate is impossible, and the game is drawn by this rule. On the other hand, if both players still have a knight, there is a highly unlikely yet theoretical possibility of checkmate, so this rule does not apply. The dead position rule supersedes the previous rule which referred to "insufficient material", extending it to include other positions where checkmate is impossible, such as blocked pawn endings where the pawns cannot be attacked.
  In tournament chess, draws are most commonly reached by mutual agreement between the players. The correct procedure is to verbally offer the draw, make a move, then start the opponent's clock. Traditionally, players have been allowed to agree to a draw at any point in the game, occasionally even without playing a move; in recent years efforts have been made to discourage short draws, for example by forbidding draw offers before move thirty.
  This most commonly occurs when neither side is able to avoid repeating moves without incurring a disadvantage. In this situation, either player can claim a draw; this requires the players to keep a valid written record of the game so that the claim can be verified by the arbiter if challenged. The three occurrences of the position need not occur on consecutive moves for a claim to be valid. The addition of the fivefold repetition rule in 2014 requires the arbiter to intervene immediately and declare the game a draw after five occurrences of the same position, consecutive or otherwise, without requiring a claim by either player. FIDE rules make no mention of perpetual check; this is merely a specific type of draw by threefold repetition.
  If during the previous 50 moves no pawn has been moved and no capture has been made, either player can claim a draw. The addition of the seventy-five-move rule in 2014 requires the arbiter to intervene and immediately declare the game drawn after 75 moves without a pawn move or capture, without requiring a claim by either player. There are several known endgames where it is possible to force a mate but it requires more than 50 moves before a pawn move or capture is made; examples include some endgames with two knights against a pawn and some pawnless endgames such as queen against two bishops. Historically, FIDE has sometimes revised the fifty-move rule to make exceptions for these endgames, but these have since been repealed. Some correspondence chess organizations do not enforce the fifty-move rule.
  In games with a time control, the game is drawn if a player is out of time and no sequence of legal moves would allow the opponent to checkmate the player.
 Draw by resignation: Under FIDE Laws, a game is drawn if a player resigns and no sequence of legal moves would allow the opponent to checkmate that player.

Time control

In competition, chess games are played with a time control. If a player's time runs out before the game is completed, the game is automatically lost (provided the opponent has  to deliver checkmate). The duration of a game ranges from long (or "classical") games, which can take up to seven hours (even longer if adjournments are permitted), to bullet chess (under 3 minutes per player for the entire game). Intermediate between these are rapid chess games, lasting between one and two hours per game, a popular time control in amateur weekend tournaments.

Time is controlled using a chess clock that has two displays, one for each player's remaining time. Analog chess clocks have been largely replaced by digital clocks, which allow for time controls with increments.

Time controls are also enforced in correspondence chess competitions. A typical time control is 50 days for every 10 moves.

Notation

Historically, many different notation systems have been used to record chess moves; the standard system today is short-form algebraic notation. In this system, each square is uniquely identified by a set of coordinates, – for the files followed by – for the ranks. The usual format is:
 –  – 

The pieces are identified by their initials. For example, Qg5 means "queen moves to the g-file, 5th rank" (that is, to the square g5). Different initials may be used for other languages. In chess literature, figurine algebraic notation (FAN) is frequently used to aid understanding independent of language.

To resolve ambiguities, an additional letter or number is added to indicate the file or rank from which the piece moved (e.g. Ngf3 means "knight from the g-file moves to the square f3"; R1e2 means "rook on the first rank moves to e2"). For pawns, no letter initial is used; so e4 means "pawn moves to the square e4".

If the piece makes a capture, "x" is usually inserted before the destination square. Thus Bxf3 means "bishop captures on f3". When a pawn makes a capture, the file from which the pawn departed is used to identify the pawn making the capture, for example, exd5 (pawn on the e-file captures the piece on d5). Ranks may be omitted if unambiguous, for example, exd (pawn on the e-file captures a piece somewhere on the d-file). A minority of publications use ":" to indicate a capture, and some omit the capture symbol altogether. In its most abbreviated form, exd5 may be rendered simply as ed. An en passant capture may optionally be marked with the notation "e.p."

If a pawn moves to its last rank, achieving promotion, the piece chosen is indicated after the move (for example, e1=Q or e1Q). Castling is indicated by the special notations 0-0 (or O-O) for  castling and 0-0-0 (or O-O-O) for  castling. A move that places the opponent's king in check usually has the notation "+" added. There are no specific notations for discovered check or double check. Checkmate can be indicated by "#". At the end of the game, "1–0" means White won, "0–1" means Black won, and "½–½" indicates a draw.
Chess moves can be annotated with punctuation marks and other symbols. For example: "!" indicates a good move; "!!" an excellent move; "?" a mistake; "??" a blunder; "!?" an interesting move that may not be best; or "?!" a dubious move not easily refuted.

For example, one variation of a simple trap known as the Scholar's mate (see animated diagram) can be recorded:
1. e4 e5 2. Qh5 Nc6 3. Bc4 Nf6 4. Qxf7

Variants of algebraic notation include long form algebraic, in which both the departure and destination square are indicated; abbreviated algebraic, in which capture signs, check signs, and ranks of pawn captures may be omitted; and Figurine Algebraic Notation, used in chess publications for universal readability regardless of language.

Portable Game Notation (PGN) is a text-based file format for recording chess games, based on short form English algebraic notation with a small amount of markup. PGN files (suffix .pgn) can be processed by most chess software, as well as being easily readable by humans.

Until about 1980, the majority of English language chess publications used descriptive notation, in which files are identified by the initial letter of the piece that occupies the first rank at the beginning of the game. In descriptive notation, the common opening move 1.e4 is rendered as "1.P-K4" ("pawn to king four"). Another system is ICCF numeric notation, recognized by the International Correspondence Chess Federation though its use is in decline.

In competitive games, players are normally required to keep a score (record of the game). For this purpose, only algebraic notation is recognized in FIDE-sanctioned events; game scores recorded in a different notation system may not be used as evidence in the event of a dispute.

Organized competition

Tournaments and matches

Contemporary chess is an organized sport with structured international and national leagues, tournaments, and congresses. Thousands of chess tournaments, matches, and festivals are held around the world every year catering to players of all levels.

Tournaments with a small number of players may use the round-robin format, in which every player plays one game against every other player. For a large numbers of players, the Swiss system may be used, in which each player is paired against an opponent who has the same (or as similar as possible) score in each round. In either case, a player's score is usually calculated as 1 point for each game won and one-half point for each game drawn. Variations such as "football scoring" (3 points for a win, 1 point for a draw) may be used by tournament organizers, but ratings are always calculated on the basis of standard scoring. There are different ways to denote a player's score in a match or tournament, most commonly: P/G (points scored out of games played, e.g. 5½/8); P–A (points for and points against, e.g. 5½–2½); or +W−L=D (W wins, L losses, D draws, e.g. +4−1=3).

The term "" refers not to an individual game, but to either a series of games between two players, or a team competition in which each player of one team plays one game against a player of the other team.

Governance
Chess's international governing body is usually known by its French acronym FIDE (pronounced FEE-day) (French: Fédération internationale des échecs), or International Chess Federation. FIDE's membership consists of the national chess organizations of over 180 countries; there are also several associate members, including various supra-national organizations, the International Braille Chess Association (IBCA), International Committee of Chess for the Deaf (ICCD), and the International Physically Disabled Chess Association (IPCA). FIDE is recognized as a sports governing body by the International Olympic Committee, but chess has never been part of the Olympic Games.

FIDE's most visible activity is organizing the World Chess Championship, a role it assumed in 1948. The current World Champion is Magnus Carlsen of Norway. The reigning Women's World Champion is Ju Wenjun from China.

Other competitions for individuals include the World Junior Chess Championship, the European Individual Chess Championship, the tournaments for the World Championship qualification cycle, and the various national championships. Invitation-only tournaments regularly attract the world's strongest players. Examples include Spain's Linares event, Monte Carlo's Melody Amber tournament, the Dortmund Sparkassen meeting, Sofia's M-tel Masters, and Wijk aan Zee's Tata Steel tournament.

Regular team chess events include the Chess Olympiad and the European Team Chess Championship.

The World Chess Solving Championship and World Correspondence Chess Championships include both team and individual events; these are held independently of FIDE.

Titles and rankings

In order to rank players, FIDE, ICCF, and most national chess organizations use the Elo rating system developed by Arpad Elo. An average club player has a rating of about 1500; the highest FIDE rating of all time, 2882, was achieved by Magnus Carlsen on the March 2014 FIDE rating list.

Players may be awarded lifetime titles by FIDE:

 Grandmaster (GM; sometimes  or IGM is used) is awarded to world-class chess masters. Apart from World Champion, Grandmaster is the highest title a chess player can attain. Before FIDE will confer the title on a player, the player must have an Elo rating of at least 2500 at one time and three results of a prescribed standard (called norms) in tournaments involving other grandmasters, including some from countries other than the applicant's. There are other milestones a player can achieve to attain the title, such as winning the World Junior Championship.
 International Master (IM). The conditions are similar to GM, but less demanding. The minimum rating for the IM title is 2400.
 FIDE Master (FM). The usual way for a player to qualify for the FIDE Master title is by achieving a FIDE rating of 2300 or more.
 Candidate Master (CM). Similar to FM, but with a FIDE rating of at least 2200.

The above titles are open to both men and women. There are also separate women-only titles; Woman Grandmaster (WGM), Woman International Master (WIM), Woman FIDE Master (WFM) and Woman Candidate Master (WCM). These require a performance level approximately 200 Elo rating points below the similarly named open titles, and their continued existence has sometimes been controversial. Beginning with Nona Gaprindashvili in 1978, a number of women have earned the open GM title.

FIDE also awards titles for arbiters and trainers. International titles are also awarded to composers and solvers of chess problems and to correspondence chess players (by the International Correspondence Chess Federation). National chess organizations may also award titles.

Theory

Chess has an extensive literature. In 1913, the chess historian H.J.R. Murray estimated the total number of books, magazines, and chess columns in newspapers to be about 5,000. B.H. Wood estimated the number, as of 1949, to be about 20,000. David Hooper and Kenneth Whyld write that, "Since then there has been a steady increase year by year of the number of new chess publications. No one knows how many have been printed." Significant public chess libraries include the John G. White Chess and Checkers Collection at Cleveland Public Library, with over 32,000 chess books and over 6,000 bound volumes of chess periodicals; and the Chess & Draughts collection at the National Library of the Netherlands, with about 30,000 books.

Chess theory usually divides the game of chess into three phases with different sets of strategies: the opening, typically the first 10 to 20 moves, when players move their pieces to useful positions for the coming battle; the middlegame; and last the endgame, when most of the pieces are gone, kings typically take a more active part in the struggle, and pawn promotion is often decisive.

 is concerned with finding the best moves in the initial phase of the game. There are dozens of different openings, and hundreds of variants. The Oxford Companion to Chess lists 1,327 named openings and variants.

 is usually divided into chess tactics and chess strategy. Chess strategy concentrates on setting and achieving long-term positioning advantages during the game – for example, where to place different pieces – while tactics concerns immediate maneuver. These two aspects of the gameplay cannot be completely separated, because strategic goals are mostly achieved through tactics, while the tactical opportunities are based on the previous strategy of play.

 is concerned with positions where there are only a few pieces left. Theoretics categorize these positions according to the pieces, for example "King and pawn endings" or "Rook versus a minor piece".

Opening

A chess opening is the group of initial moves of a game (the "opening moves"). They are catalogued in reference works such as the Encyclopaedia of Chess Openings. There are dozens of different openings, varying widely in character from quiet  (for example, the Réti Opening) to very aggressive (the Latvian Gambit). In some opening lines, the exact sequence considered best for both sides has been worked out to more than 30 moves. Professional players spend years studying openings and continue doing so throughout their careers, as opening theory continues to evolve.

The fundamental strategic aims of most openings are similar:
  This is the technique of placing the pieces (particularly bishops and knights) on useful squares where they will have an optimal impact on the game.
  Control of the central squares allows pieces to be moved to any part of the board relatively easily, and can also have a cramping effect on the opponent.
  It is critical to keep the king safe from dangerous possibilities. A correctly timed castling can often enhance this.
  Players strive to avoid the creation of pawn weaknesses such as isolated, doubled, or backward pawns, and pawn islands – and to force such weaknesses in the opponent's position.

Most players and theoreticians consider that White, by virtue of the first move, begins the game with a small advantage. This initially gives White the initiative. Black usually strives to neutralize White's advantage and achieve , or to develop   in an unbalanced position.

Middlegame

The middlegame is the part of the game which starts after the opening. There is no clear line between the opening and the middlegame, but typically the middlegame will start when most pieces have been developed. (Similarly, there is no clear transition from the middlegame to the endgame; see start of the endgame.) Because the opening theory has ended, players have to form plans based on the features of the position, and at the same time take into account the tactical possibilities of the position. The middlegame is the phase in which most combinations occur. Combinations are a series of tactical moves executed to achieve some gain. Middlegame combinations are often connected with an attack against the opponent's king. Some typical patterns have their own names; for example, the Boden's Mate or the Lasker–Bauer combination.

Specific plans or strategic themes will often arise from particular groups of openings which result in a specific type of pawn structure. The study of openings is therefore connected to the preparation of plans that are typical of the resulting middlegames.

Another important strategic question in the middlegame is whether and how to reduce material and transition into an endgame (i.e. ). Minor material advantages can generally be transformed into victory only in an endgame, and therefore the stronger side must choose an appropriate way to achieve an ending. Not every reduction of material is good for this purpose; for example, if one side keeps a light-squared bishop and the opponent has a dark-squared one, the transformation into a bishops and pawns ending is usually advantageous for the weaker side only, because an endgame with bishops on opposite colors is likely to be a draw, even with an advantage of a pawn, or sometimes even with a two-pawn advantage.

Tactics

In chess, tactics in general concentrate on short-term actions – so short-term that they can be calculated in advance by a human player or a computer. The possible depth of calculation depends on the player's ability. In  positions with many possibilities on both sides, a deep calculation is more difficult and may not be practical, while in positions with a limited number of  variations, strong players can calculate long sequences of moves.

Theoreticians describe many elementary tactical methods and typical maneuvers, for example: pins, forks, skewers, batteries, discovered attacks (especially discovered checks), zwischenzugs, deflections, decoys, sacrifices, underminings, overloadings, and interferences. Brilliant combinations – such as those in the Immortal Game – are considered beautiful and are admired by chess lovers. A common type of chess exercise, aimed at developing players' skills, is a position where a decisive combination is available and the challenge is to find it.

Strategy

Chess strategy is concerned with the evaluation of chess positions and with setting up goals and long-term plans for future play. During the evaluation, players must take into account numerous factors such as the value of the pieces on the board, control of the center and centralization, the pawn structure, king safety, and the control of key squares or groups of squares (for example, diagonals, open files, and dark or light squares).

The most basic step in evaluating a position is to count the total value of pieces of both sides. The point values used for this purpose are based on experience; usually, pawns are considered worth one point, knights and bishops about three points each, rooks about five points (the value difference between a rook and a bishop or knight being known as the exchange), and queens about nine points. The king is more valuable than all of the other pieces combined, since its checkmate loses the game. But in practical terms, in the endgame, the king as a fighting piece is generally more powerful than a bishop or knight but less powerful than a rook.

Since pawns are the least mobile of the pieces, pawn structure is relatively static and largely determines the strategic nature of the position. Care must therefore be taken to avoid these weaknesses unless they are compensated by another valuable asset (for example, by the possibility of developing an attack).

Endgame

The endgame (also  or ) is the stage of the game when there are few pieces left on the board. There are three main strategic differences between earlier stages of the game and the endgame:
 Pawns become more important. Endgames often revolve around endeavors to promote a pawn by advancing it to the furthest .
 The king, which requires safeguarding from attack during the middlegame, emerges as a strong piece in the endgame. It is often brought to the  where it can protect its own pawns, attack enemy pawns, and hinder moves of the opponent's king.
 Zugzwang, a situation in which the player who is to move is forced to incur a disadvantage, is often a factor in endgames but rarely in other stages of the game. In the example diagram, either side having the move is in zugzwang: Black to move must play 1...Kb7 allowing White to promote the pawn after 2.Kd7; White to move must permit a draw, either by 1.Kc6 stalemate or by losing the pawn after any other legal move.

Endgames can be classified according to the type of pieces remaining on the board. Basic checkmates are positions in which one side has only a king and the other side has one or two pieces and can checkmate the opposing king, with the pieces working together with their king. For example, king and pawn endgames involve only kings and pawns on one or both sides, and the task of the stronger side is to promote one of the pawns. Other more complicated endings are classified according to pieces on the board other than kings, such as "rook and pawn versus rook" endgames.

History

Origins

The earliest texts referring to the origins of chess date from the beginning of the 7th century. Three are written in Pahlavi (Middle Persian) and one, the Harshacharita, is in Sanskrit. One of these texts, the Chatrang-namak, represents one of the earliest written accounts of chess. The narrator Bozorgmehr explains that Chatrang, the Pahlavi word for chess, was introduced to Persia by 'Dewasarm, a great ruler of India' during the reign of Khosrow I.

The oldest known chess manual was in Arabic and dates to about 840, written by al-Adli ar-Rumi (800–870), a renowned Arab chess player, titled Kitab ash-shatranj (The Book of Chess). This is a lost manuscript, but is referenced in later works. Here also, al-Adli attributes the origins of Persian chess to India, along with the eighth-century collection of fables Kalīla wa-Dimna. By the twentieth century, a substantial consensus developed regarding chess's origins in northwest India in the early 7th century. More recently, this consensus has been the subject of further scrutiny.

Chaturanga was played on an 8×8 uncheckered board, called . Thence it spread eastward and westward along the Silk Road. The earliest evidence of chess is found in the nearby Sasanian Persia around 600 A.D., where the game came to be known by the name . Chatrang was taken up by the Muslim world after the Islamic conquest of Persia (633–51), where it was then named , with the pieces largely retaining their Persian names. In Spanish, "shatranj" was rendered as ajedrez ("al-shatranj"), in Portuguese as xadrez, and in Greek as ζατρίκιον (zatrikion, which comes directly from the Persian chatrang), but in the rest of Europe it was replaced by versions of the Persian shāh ("king"), from which the English words "check" and "chess" descend. The word "checkmate" is derived from the Persian shāh māt ("the king is dead").

Xiangqi is the form of chess best-known in China. The eastern migration of chess, into China and Southeast Asia, has even less documentation than its migration west, making it largely conjectured. The word   was used in China to refer to a game from 569 A.D. at the latest, but it has not been proven if this game was or was not directly related to chess.
The first reference to Chinese chess appears in a book entitled Xuán guaì lù  ("Record of the Mysterious and Strange"), dating to about 800. A minority view holds that western chess arose from xiàngqí or one of its predecessors, although this has been contested. Chess historians Jean-Louis Cazaux and Rick Knowlton contend that xiangqi's intrinsic characteristics make it easier to construct an evolutionary path from China to India/Persia than the opposite direction.

The oldest archaeological chess artifacts – ivory pieces – were excavated in ancient Afrasiab, today's Samarkand, in Uzbekistan, Central Asia, and date to about 760, with some of them possibly being older. Remarkably, almost all findings of the oldest pieces come from along the Silk Road, from the former regions of the Tarim Basin (today's Xinjiang in China), Transoxiana, Sogdiana, Bactria, Gandhara, to Iran on one end and to India through Kashmir on the other.

The game reached Western Europe and Russia via at least three routes, the earliest being in the 9th century. By the year 1000, it had spread throughout both the Muslim Iberia and Latin Europe. A Latin poem called Versus de scachis ("Verses on Chess") dated to the late 10th century, has been preserved at Einsiedeln Abbey in Switzerland.

1200–1700: Origins of the modern game

The game of chess was then played and known in all European countries. A famous 13th-century Spanish manuscript covering chess, backgammon, and dice is known as the Libro de los juegos, which is the earliest European treatise on chess as well as being the oldest document on European tables games. The rules were fundamentally similar to those of the Arabic shatranj. The differences were mostly in the use of a checkered board instead of a plain monochrome board used by Arabs and the habit of allowing some or all pawns to make an initial double step. In some regions, the Queen, which had replaced the Wazir, and/or the King could also make an initial two-square leap under some conditions. 

Around 1200, the rules of shatranj started to be modified in Europe, culminating, several major changes later, in the emergence of modern chess practically as it is known today. A major change was the modern piece movement rules, which began to appear in intellectual circles in Valencia, Spain, around 1475, which established the foundations and brought it very close to current Chess. These new rules then were quickly adopted in Italy and Southern France before diffusing into the rest of Europe. Pawns gained the ability to advance two squares on their first move, while bishops and queens acquired their modern movement powers. The queen replaced the earlier vizier chess piece toward the end of the 10th century and by the 15th century had become the most powerful piece; in light of that, modern chess was often referred to at the time as "Queen's Chess" or "Mad Queen Chess". Castling, derived from the "king's leap", usually in combination with a pawn or rook move to bring the king to safety, was introduced. These new rules quickly spread throughout Western Europe.

Writings about chess theory began to appear in the late 15th century. An anonymous treatise on chess of 1490 with the first part containing some openings and the second 30 endgames is deposited in the library of the University of Göttingen. The book El Libro dels jochs partitis dels schachs en nombre de 100 was written by Francesc Vicent in Segorbe in 1495, but no copy of this work has survived. The Repetición de Amores y Arte de Ajedrez (Repetition of Love and the Art of Playing Chess) by Spanish churchman Luis Ramírez de Lucena was published in Salamanca in 1497. Lucena and later masters like Portuguese Pedro Damiano, Italians Giovanni Leonardo Di Bona, Giulio Cesare Polerio and Gioachino Greco, and Spanish bishop Ruy López de Segura developed elements of opening theory and started to analyze simple endgames.

1700–1873: Romantic era

In the 18th century, the center of European chess life moved from Southern Europe to mainland France. The two most important French masters were François-André Danican Philidor, a musician by profession, who discovered the importance of pawns for chess strategy, and later Louis-Charles Mahé de La Bourdonnais, who won a famous series of matches against Irish master Alexander McDonnell in 1834. Centers of chess activity in this period were coffee houses in major European cities like Café de la Régence in Paris and Simpson's Divan in London.

At the same time, the intellectual movement of romanticism had had a far-reaching impact on chess, with aesthetics and tactical beauty being held in higher regard than objective soundness and strategic planning. As a result, virtually all games began with the Open Game, and it was considered unsportsmanlike to decline gambits that invited tactical play such as the King's Gambit and the Evans Gambit. This chess philosophy is known as Romantic chess, and a sharp, tactical style consistent with the principles of chess romanticism was predominant until the late 19th century.

The rules concerning stalemate were finalized in the early 19th century. Also in the 19th century, the convention that White moves first was established (formerly either White or Black could move first). Finally, the rules around castling and en passant captures were standardized – variations in these rules persisted in Italy until the late 19th century. Since the 19th century, the only rule changes, such as the establishment of the correct procedure for claiming a draw by repetition, have been technical in nature.

As the 19th century progressed, chess organization developed quickly. Many chess clubs, chess books, and chess journals appeared. There were correspondence matches between cities; for example, the London Chess Club played against the Edinburgh Chess Club in 1824. Chess problems became a regular part of 19th-century newspapers; Bernhard Horwitz, Josef Kling, and Samuel Loyd composed some of the most influential problems. In 1843, von der Lasa published his and Bilguer's Handbuch des Schachspiels (Handbook of Chess), the first comprehensive manual of chess theory.

The first modern chess tournament was organized by Howard Staunton, a leading English chess player, and was held in London in 1851. It was won by the German Adolf Anderssen, who was hailed as the leading chess master. His brilliant, energetic attacking style was typical for the time. Sparkling games like Anderssen's Immortal Game and Evergreen Game or Morphy's "Opera Game" were regarded as the highest possible summit of the art of chess.

Deeper insight into the nature of chess came with the American Paul Morphy, an extraordinary chess prodigy. Morphy won against all important competitors (except Staunton, who refused to play), including Anderssen, during his short chess career between 1857 and 1863. Morphy's success stemmed from a combination of brilliant attacks and sound strategy; he intuitively knew how to prepare attacks.

1873–1945: Birth of a sport

Prague-born Wilhelm Steinitz laid the foundations for a scientific approach to the game, the art of breaking a position down into components and preparing correct plans. In addition to his theoretical achievements, Steinitz founded an important tradition: his triumph over the leading German master Johannes Zukertort in 1886 is regarded as the first official World Chess Championship. This win marked a stylistic transition at the highest levels of chess from an attacking, tactical style predominant in the Romantic era to a more positional, strategic style introduced to the chess world by Steinitz. Steinitz lost his crown in 1894 to a much younger player, the German mathematician Emanuel Lasker, who maintained this title for 27 years, the longest tenure of any world champion.

After the end of the 19th century, the number of master tournaments and matches held annually quickly grew. The first Olympiad was held in Paris in 1924, and FIDE was founded initially for the purpose of organizing that event. In 1927, the Women's World Chess Championship was established; the first to hold the title was Czech-English master Vera Menchik.

A prodigy from Cuba, José Raúl Capablanca, known for his skill in endgames, won the World Championship from Lasker in 1921. Capablanca was undefeated in tournament play for eight years, from 1916 to 1924. His successor (1927) was the Russian-French Alexander Alekhine, a strong attacking player who died as the world champion in 1946. Alekhine briefly lost the title to Dutch player Max Euwe in 1935 and regained it two years later.

In the interwar period, chess was revolutionized by the new theoretical school of so-called hypermodernists like Aron Nimzowitsch and Richard Réti.

1945–1990: Post-World War II era

After the death of Alekhine, a new World Champion was sought. FIDE, which has controlled the title since then, ran a tournament of elite players. The winner of the 1948 tournament was Russian Mikhail Botvinnik.
In 1950 FIDE established a system of titles, conferring the titles of Grandmaster and International Master on 27 players. (Some sources state that in 1914 the title of chess Grandmaster was first formally conferred by Tsar Nicholas II of Russia to Lasker, Capablanca, Alekhine, Tarrasch, and Marshall, but this is a disputed claim.)

Botvinnik started an era of Soviet dominance in the chess world, which mainly through the Soviet government's politically inspired efforts to demonstrate intellectual superiority over the West stood almost uninterrupted for more than a half-century. Until the dissolution of the Soviet Union, there was only one non-Soviet champion, American Bobby Fischer (champion 1972–1975). Botvinnik also revolutionized opening theory. Previously, Black strove for equality, attempting to neutralize White's first-move advantage. As Black, Botvinnik strove for the initiative from the beginning. In the previous informal system of World Championships, the current champion decided which challenger he would play for the title and the challenger was forced to seek sponsors for the match. FIDE set up a new system of qualifying tournaments and matches. The world's strongest players were seeded into Interzonal tournaments, where they were joined by players who had qualified from Zonal tournaments. The leading finishers in these Interzonals would go through the "Candidates" stage, which was initially a tournament, and later a series of knockout matches. The winner of the Candidates would then play the reigning champion for the title. A champion defeated in a match had a right to play a rematch a year later. This system operated on a three-year cycle. Botvinnik participated in championship matches over a period of fifteen years. He won the world championship tournament in 1948 and retained the title in tied matches in 1951 and 1954. In 1957, he lost to Vasily Smyslov, but regained the title in a rematch in 1958. In 1960, he lost the title to the 23-year-old Latvian prodigy Mikhail Tal, an accomplished tactician and attacking player who is widely regarded as one of the most creative players ever, hence his nickname "the magician from Riga". Botvinnik again regained the title in a rematch in 1961.

Following the 1961 event, FIDE abolished the automatic right of a deposed champion to a rematch, and the next champion, Armenian Tigran Petrosian, a player renowned for his defensive and positional skills, held the title for two cycles, 1963–1969. His successor, Boris Spassky from Russia (champion 1969–1972), won games in both positional and sharp tactical style. The next championship, the so-called Match of the Century, saw the first non-Soviet challenger since World War II, American Bobby Fischer. Fischer defeated his opponents in the Candidates matches by unheard-of margins, and convincingly defeated Spassky for the world championship. The match was followed closely by news media of the day, leading to a surge in popularity for chess; it also held significant political importance at the height of the Cold War, with the match being seen by both sides as a microcosm of the conflict between East and West. In 1975, however, Fischer refused to defend his title against Soviet Anatoly Karpov when he was unable to reach agreement on conditions with FIDE, and Karpov obtained the title by default. Fischer modernized many aspects of chess, especially by extensively preparing openings.

Karpov defended his title twice against Viktor Korchnoi and dominated the 1970s and early 1980s with a string of tournament successes. In the 1984 World Chess Championship, Karpov faced his toughest challenge to date, the young Garry Kasparov from Baku, Soviet Azerbaijan. The match was aborted in controversial circumstances after 5 months and 48 games with Karpov leading by 5 wins to 3, but evidently exhausted; many commentators believed Kasparov, who had won the last two games, would have won the match had it continued. Kasparov won the 1985 rematch. Kasparov and Karpov contested three further closely fought matches in 1986, 1987 and 1990, Kasparov winning them all. Kasparov became the dominant figure of world chess from the mid 1980s until his retirement from competition in 2005.

Beginnings of chess technology
Chess-playing computer programs (later known as chess engines) began to appear in the 1960s. In 1970, the first major computer chess tournament, the North American Computer Chess Championship, was held, followed in 1974 by the first World Computer Chess Championship. In the late 1970s, dedicated home chess computers such as Fidelity Electronics' Chess Challenger became commercially available, as well as software to run on home computers. However, the overall standard of computer chess was low until the 1990s.

The first endgame tablebases, which provided perfect play for relatively simple endgames such as king and rook versus king and bishop, appeared in the late 1970s. This set a precedent to the complete six- and seven-piece tablebases that became available in the 2000s and 2010s respectively.

The first commercial chess database, a collection of chess games searchable by move and position, was introduced by the German company ChessBase in 1987. Databases containing millions of chess games have since had a profound effect on opening theory and other areas of chess research.

Digital chess clocks were invented in 1973, though they did not become commonplace until the 1990s. Digital clocks allow for time controls involving increments and delays.

1990–present: Rise of computers and online chess

Technology
The Internet enabled online chess as a new medium of playing, with chess servers allowing users to play other people from different parts of the world in real time. The first such server, known as Internet Chess Server or ICS, was developed at the University of Utah in 1992. ICS formed the basis for the first commercial chess server, the Internet Chess Club, which was launched in 1995, and for other early chess servers such as FICS (Free Internet Chess Server). Since then, many other platforms have appeared, and online chess began to rival over-the-board chess in popularity. During the 2020 COVID-19 pandemic, the isolation ensuing from quarantines imposed in many places around the world, combined with the success of the popular Netflix show The Queen's Gambit and other factors such as the popularity of online tournaments (notably PogChamps) and chess Twitch streamers, resulted in a surge of popularity not only for online chess, but for the game of chess in general; this phenomenon has been referred to in the media as the 2020 online chess boom.

Computer chess has also seen major advances. By the 1990s, chess engines could consistently defeat most amateurs, and in 1997 Deep Blue defeated World Champion Garry Kasparov in a six-game match, starting an era of computer dominance at the highest level of chess. In the 2010s, engines of superhuman strength became accessible for free on a number of PC and mobile platforms, and free engine analysis became a commonplace feature on internet chess servers. An adverse effect of the easy availability of engine analysis on hand-held devices and personal computers has been the rise of computer cheating, which has grown to be a major concern in both over-the-board and online chess. In 2017, AlphaZero – a neural network also capable of playing shogi and Go – was introduced. Since then, many chess engines based on neural network evaluation have been written, the best of which have surpassed the traditional "brute-force" engines. AlphaZero also introduced many novel ideas and ways of playing the game, which affected the style of play at the top level.

As endgame tablebases developed, they began to provide perfect play in endgame positions in which the game-theoretical outcome was previously unknown, such as positions with king, queen and pawn against king and queen. In 1991, Lewis Stiller published a tablebase for select six-piece endgames, and by 2005, following the publication of Nalimov tablebases, all six-piece endgame positions were solved. In 2012, Lomonosov tablebases were published which solved all seven-piece endgame positions. Use of tablebases enhances the performance of chess engines by providing definitive results in some branches of analysis.

Technological progress made in the 1990s and the 21st century has influenced the way that chess is studied at all levels, as well as the state of chess as a spectator sport.

Previously, preparation at the professional level required an extensive chess library and several subscriptions to publications such as Chess Informant to keep up with opening developments and study opponents' games. Today, preparation at the professional level involves the use of databases containing millions of games, and engines to analyze different opening variations and prepare novelties. A number of online learning resources are also available for players of all levels, such as online courses, tactics trainers, and video lessons.

Since the late 1990s, it has been possible to follow major international chess events online, the players' moves being relayed in real time. Sensory boards have been developed to enable automatic transmission of moves. Chess players will frequently run engines while watching these games, allowing them to quickly identify mistakes by the players and spot tactical opportunities. While in the past the moves have been relayed live, today chess organizers will often impose a half-hour delay as an anti-cheating measure. In the mid-to-late 2010s – and especially following the 2020 online boom – it became commonplace for supergrandmasters, such as Hikaru Nakamura and Magnus Carlsen, to livestream chess content on platforms such as Twitch. Also following the boom, online chess started being viewed as an e-sport, with e-sport teams signing chess players for the first time in 2020.

Growth

Organized chess even for young children has become common. FIDE holds world championships for age levels down to 8 years old. The largest tournaments, in number of players, are those held for children.

The number of grandmasters and other chess professionals has also grown in the modern era. Kenneth Regan and Guy Haworth conducted research involving comparison of move choices by players of different levels and from different periods with the analysis of strong chess engines; they concluded that the increase in the number of grandmasters and higher Elo ratings of the top players reflect an actual increase in the average standard of play, rather than "rating inflation" or "title inflation".

Professional chess
In 1993, Garry Kasparov and Nigel Short broke ties with FIDE to organize their own match for the title and formed a competing Professional Chess Association (PCA). From then until 2006, there were two simultaneous World Championships and respective World Champions: the PCA or "classical" champions extending the Steinitzian tradition in which the current champion plays a challenger in a series of games, and the other following FIDE's new format of many players competing in a large knockout tournament to determine the champion. Kasparov lost his PCA title in 2000 to Vladimir Kramnik of Russia. Due to the complicated state of world chess politics and difficulties obtaining commercial sponsorships, Kasparov was never able to challenge for the title again. Despite this, he continued to dominate in top level tournaments and remained the world's highest rated player until his retirement from competitive chess in 2005.

The World Chess Championship 2006, in which Kramnik beat the FIDE World Champion Veselin Topalov, reunified the titles and made Kramnik the undisputed World Chess Champion. In September 2007, he lost the title to Viswanathan Anand of India, who won the championship tournament in Mexico City. Anand defended his title in the revenge match of 2008, 2010 and 2012. In 2013, Magnus Carlsen of Norway beat Anand in the 2013 World Chess Championship. He defended his title 4 times since then and is the reigning world champion.

Connections

Arts and humanities

In the Middle Ages and during the Renaissance, chess was a part of noble culture; it was used to teach war strategy and was dubbed the "King's Game". Gentlemen are "to be meanly seene in the play at Chestes", says the overview at the beginning of Baldassare Castiglione's The Book of the Courtier (1528, English 1561 by Sir Thomas Hoby), but chess should not be a gentleman's main passion. Castiglione explains it further:

And what say you to the game at chestes? It is truely an honest kynde of enterteynmente and wittie, quoth Syr Friderick. But me think it hath a fault, whiche is, that a man may be to couning at it, for who ever will be excellent in the playe of chestes, I beleave he must beestowe much tyme about it, and applie it with so much study, that a man may assoone learne some noble scyence, or compase any other matter of importaunce, and yet in the ende in beestowing all that laboure, he knoweth no more but a game. Therfore in this I beleave there happeneth a very rare thing, namely, that the meane is more commendable, then the excellency.

Some of the elaborate chess sets used by the aristocracy at least partially survive, such as the Lewis chessmen.

Chess was often used as a basis of sermons on morality. An example is Liber de moribus hominum et officiis nobilium sive super ludo scacchorum ('Book of the customs of men and the duties of nobles or the Book of Chess'), written by an Italian Dominican monk Jacobus de Cessolis . This book was one of the most popular of the Middle Ages. The work was translated into many other languages (the first printed edition was published at Utrecht in 1473) and was the basis for William Caxton's The Game and Playe of the Chesse (1474), one of the first books printed in English. Different chess pieces were used as metaphors for different classes of people, and human duties were derived from the rules of the game or from visual properties of the chess pieces:

The knyght ought to be made alle armed upon an hors in suche wyse that he haue an helme on his heed and a spere in his ryght hande/ and coueryd wyth his sheld/ a swerde and a mace on his lyft syde/ Cladd wyth an hawberk and plates to fore his breste/ legge harnoys on his legges/ Spores on his heelis on his handes his gauntelettes/ his hors well broken and taught and apte to bataylle and couerid with his armes/ whan the knyghtes ben maad they ben bayned or bathed/ that is the signe that they shold lede a newe lyf and newe maners/ also they wake alle the nyght in prayers and orysons vnto god that he wylle gyue hem grace that they may gete that thynge that they may not gete by nature/ The kynge or prynce gyrdeth a boute them a swerde in signe/ that they shold abyde and kepe hym of whom they take theyr dispenses and dignyte.

Known in the circles of clerics, students, and merchants, chess entered into the popular culture of the Middle Ages. An example is the 209th song of Carmina Burana from the 13th century, which starts with the names of chess pieces, Roch, pedites, regina... The game of chess, at times, has been discouraged by various religious authorities in Middle Ages: Jewish, Catholic and Orthodox. Some Muslim authorities prohibited it even recently, for example Ruhollah Khomeini in 1979 and Abdul-Aziz ash-Sheikh even later.

During the Age of Enlightenment, chess was viewed as a means of self-improvement. Benjamin Franklin, in his article "The Morals of Chess" (1750), wrote:

The Game of Chess is not merely an idle amusement; several very valuable qualities of the mind, useful in the course of human life, are to be acquired and strengthened by it, so as to become habits ready on all occasions; for life is a kind of Chess, in which we have often points to gain, and competitors or adversaries to contend with, and in which there is a vast variety of good and ill events, that are, in some degree, the effect of prudence, or the want of it. By playing at Chess then, we may learn:

I. Foresight, which looks a little into futurity, and considers the consequences that may attend an action ...

II. Circumspection, which surveys the whole Chess-board, or scene of action: – the relation of the several Pieces, and their situations ...

III. Caution, not to make our moves too hastily ...

Chess was occasionally criticized in the 19th century as a waste of time.

Chess is taught to children in schools around the world today. Many schools host chess clubs, and there are many scholastic tournaments specifically for children. Tournaments are held regularly in many countries, hosted by organizations such as the United States Chess Federation and the National Scholastic Chess Foundation.

Chess is many times depicted in the arts; significant works where chess plays a key role range from Thomas Middleton's A Game at Chess to Through the Looking-Glass by Lewis Carroll, to Vladimir Nabokov's The Defense, to The Royal Game by Stefan Zweig. Chess has also featured in film classics such as Ingmar Bergman's The Seventh Seal, Satyajit Ray's The Chess Players, and Powell and Pressburger's A Matter of Life and Death.

Chess is also present in contemporary popular culture. For example, the characters in Star Trek play a futuristic version of the game called "Federation Tri-Dimensional Chess" and "Wizard's Chess" is played in J.K. Rowling's Harry Potter.

Mathematics

The game structure and nature of chess are related to several branches of mathematics. Many combinatorical and topological problems connected to chess, such as the knight's tour and the eight queens puzzle, have been known for hundreds of years.

The number of legal positions in chess is estimated to be 4.59 (+/- 0.38) x1044 with a 95% confidence level, with a game-tree complexity of approximately 10123. The game-tree complexity of chess was first calculated by Claude Shannon as 10120, a number known as the Shannon number. An average position typically has thirty to forty possible moves, but there may be as few as zero (in the case of checkmate or stalemate) or (in a constructed position) as many as 218.

In 1913, Ernst Zermelo used chess as a basis for his theory of game strategies, which is considered one of the predecessors of game theory. Zermelo's theorem states that it is possible to solve chess, i.e. to determine with certainty the outcome of a perfectly played game (either White can force a win, or Black can force a win, or both sides can force at least a draw). However, with 1043 legal positions in chess, it will take an impossibly long time to compute a perfect strategy with any feasible technology.

Psychology
There is an extensive scientific literature on chess psychology. Alfred Binet and others showed that knowledge and verbal, rather than visuospatial, ability lies at the core of expertise. In his doctoral thesis, Adriaan de Groot showed that chess masters can rapidly perceive the key features of a position. According to de Groot, this perception, made possible by years of practice and study, is more important than the sheer ability to anticipate moves. De Groot showed that chess masters can memorize positions shown for a few seconds almost perfectly. The ability to memorize does not alone account for chess-playing skill, since masters and novices, when faced with random arrangements of chess pieces, had equivalent recall (about six positions in each case). Rather, it is the ability to recognize patterns, which are then memorized, which distinguished the skilled players from the novices. When the positions of the pieces were taken from an actual game, the masters had almost total positional recall.

More recent research has focused on chess as mental training; the respective roles of knowledge and look-ahead search; brain imaging studies of chess masters and novices; blindfold chess; the role of personality and intelligence in chess skill; gender differences; and computational models of chess expertise. The role of practice and talent in the development of chess and other domains of expertise has led to much empirical investigation. Ericsson and colleagues have argued that deliberate practice is sufficient for reaching high levels of expertise in chess. Recent research, however, fails to replicate their results and indicates that factors other than practice are also important.
For example, Fernand Gobet and colleagues have shown that stronger players started playing chess at a young age and that experts born in the Northern Hemisphere are more likely to have been born in late winter and early spring. Compared to the general population, chess players are more likely to be non-right-handed, though they found no correlation between handedness and skill.

A relationship between chess skill and intelligence has long been discussed in scientific literature as well as in popular culture. Academic studies that investigate the relationship date back at least to 1927. Although one meta-analysis and most children studies find a positive correlation between general cognitive ability and chess skill, adult studies show mixed results.

Composition

Chess composition is the art of creating chess problems (also called chess compositions). The creator is known as a chess composer. There are many types of chess problems; the two most important are:
  White to move first and checkmate Black within a specified number of moves, against any defense. These are often referred to as "mate in " – for example "mate in three" (a ); two- and three-move problems are the most common. These usually involve positions that would be highly unlikely to occur in an actual game, and are intended to illustrate a particular , usually requiring a surprising or counterintuitive  move. Themes associated with chess problems occasionally appear in actual games, when they are referred to as "problem-like" moves.
  orthodox problems where the stipulation is that White to play must win or draw. The majority of studies are endgame positions.

Fairy chess is a branch of chess problem composition involving altered rules, such as the use of unconventional pieces or boards, or unusual stipulations such as reflexmates.

Tournaments for composition and solving of chess problems are organized by the World Federation for Chess Composition, which works cooperatively with but independent of FIDE. The WFCC awards titles for composing and solving chess problems.

Online chess

Online chess is chess that is played over the internet, allowing players to play against each other in real time. This is done through the use of Internet chess servers, which pair up individual players based on their rating using an Elo or similar rating system. Online chess saw a spike in growth during the quarantines of the COVID-19 pandemic. This can be attributed to both isolation and the popularity of Netflix miniseries The Queen's Gambit, which was released in October 2020. Chess app downloads on the App Store and Google Play Store rose by 63% after the show debuted. Chess.com saw more than twice as many account registrations in November as it had in previous months, and the number of games played monthly on Lichess doubled as well. There was also a demographic shift in players, with female registration on Chess.com shifting from 22% to 27% of new players. GM Maurice Ashley said "A boom is taking place in chess like we have never seen maybe since the Bobby Fischer days", attributing the growth to an increased desire to do something constructive during the pandemic. USCF Women's Program Director Jennifer Shahade stated that chess works well on the internet, since pieces do not need to be reset and matchmaking is virtually instant.

Computer chess

The idea of creating a chess-playing machine dates to the 18th century; around 1769, the chess-playing automaton called The Turk became famous before being exposed as a hoax. Serious trials based on automata, such as El Ajedrecista, were too complex and limited to be useful.
Since the advent of the digital computer in the 1950s, chess enthusiasts, computer engineers, and computer scientists have built, with increasing degrees of seriousness and success, chess-playing machines and computer programs. The groundbreaking paper on computer chess, "Programming a Computer for Playing Chess", was published in 1950 by Claude Shannon. He wrote:
The chess machine is an ideal one to start with, since: (1) the problem is sharply defined both in allowed operations (the moves) and in the ultimate goal (checkmate); (2) it is neither so simple as to be trivial nor too difficult for satisfactory solution; (3) chess is generally considered to require "thinking" for skillful play; a solution of this problem will force us either to admit the possibility of a mechanized thinking or to further restrict our concept of "thinking"; (4) the discrete structure of chess fits well into the digital nature of
modern computers.

The Association for Computing Machinery (ACM) held the first major chess tournament for computers, the North American Computer Chess Championship, in September 1970. CHESS 3.0, a chess program from Northwestern University, won the championship. The first World Computer Chess Championship, held in 1974, was won by the Soviet program Kaissa. At first considered only a curiosity, the best chess playing programs have become extremely strong. In 1997, a computer won a chess match using classical time controls against a reigning World Champion for the first time: IBM's Deep Blue beat Garry Kasparov 3½–2½ (it scored two wins, one loss, and three draws). There was some controversy over the match, and human–computer matches were relatively close over the next few years, until convincing computer victories in 2005 and in 2006.

In 2009, a mobile phone won a category 6 tournament with a performance rating of 2898: chess engine Hiarcs 13 running on the mobile phone HTC Touch HD won the Copa Mercosur tournament with nine wins and one draw. The best chess programs are now able to consistently beat the strongest human players, to the extent that human–computer matches no longer attract interest from chess players or the media. While the World Computer Chess Championship still exists, the Top Chess Engine Championship (TCEC) is widely regarded as the unofficial world championship for chess engines. The current champion is Stockfish.

With huge databases of past games and high analytical ability, computers can help players to learn chess and prepare for matches. Internet Chess Servers allow people to find and play opponents worldwide. The presence of computers and modern communication tools have raised concerns regarding cheating during games.

Variants

There are more than two thousand published chess variants, games with similar but different rules. Most of them are of relatively recent origin. They include:
 direct predecessors of chess, such as chaturanga and shatranj;
 traditional national or regional games that share common ancestors with Western chess such as xiangqi, shogi, janggi, makruk, sittuyin, and shatar;
 modern variations employing different rules (e.g. Losing chess or Chess960), different forces (e.g. Dunsany's Chess), non-standard pieces (e.g. Grand Chess), and different board geometries (e.g. hexagonal chess or Infinite chess);

In the context of chess variants, regular (i.e.

See also

 Glossary of chess
 Glossary of chess problems
 List of chess games
 List of chess players
 List of strong chess tournaments
 List of World Chess Championships
 Women in chess

Notes

References

Bibliography

Further reading
 
 
 
 
 
  (see the included supplement, "How Do You Play Chess")

External links

 
International organizations
 FIDE – World Chess Federation
 ICCF – International Correspondence Chess Federation

News
 Chessbase news
 The Week in Chess

History
 Chesshistory.com

 
Abstract strategy games
Individual sports
Indian inventions
Traditional board games
Partially solved games
Games related to chaturanga